My California is the fifth studio album by Beth Hart, released in 2010. Hart worked with Danish producer Rune Westberg, who had already worked on Beth's previous albums 37 Days and Leave the Light On. Westberg challenged Hart not to "scream with animal savagery", not to rely on the power of her voice but rather on the power of emotions. This makes My California a unique album in Hart's discography, with a constancy throughout the tracks that the fans were not used to with the previous albums.

Track listing

The European limited edition features an additional acoustic bonus track, "Oh Me Oh My".

Personnel

 Beth Hart - Lyrics, Keyboards, Piano, Strings, Vocals
 Rune Westberg - Bass, Lyrics, Engineer, Guitar, Producer
 David Wolff - Executive Producer, Management
 Stephen Galfas - Guitar, Keyboards, Mixing
 Frederik Bokkenheuser - Drums
 Tim Fagan - Lyrics (Happiness... Any Day Now)
 Jon Nichols - Lyrics (Everybody Is Sober)
 Brian Nielsen - Booking
 Arnold Wegner - Booking
 Peggy Seagren - Hair Stylist, Make-Up
 Bory Tan - Stylist
 Greg Watermann - Photography
 Lucy Watermann - Design
 Scott Guetzkow - Tour Manager
 Slash - Guitar (Sister Heroine)

References

2010 albums
Beth Hart albums